Marc Anthony Liotta (born May 11, 1961 in Turin, Italy) known as Tony Liotta,is an Italian American musician and producer.

Early life 
Tony Liotta drummer and percussionist, was born in 1961 to American / Italian parents in Turin, Italy. In the same year the parents emigrated to USA. There he grew up in New York and New Orleans. He has been playing the drums since childhood. When he was three years old, he got his first drum set. As a teenager, he began his career as a professional drummer.

Liotta came to Germany at the  age of 17 and lives in North-Rhine-Westphalia since that.
He appeared in various television programs in Italy RAI 1, RAI 2, Tele 5, LA7, in Germany WDR and on „arte“. He played at numerous festivals, workshops, concerts in England, France, Italy, Poland, Germany, the Netherlands, and other countries.
Liotta masters and plays numerous percussion instruments, such as Derbouka, Tambourine, Frame Drums, Congas, Bongos, Djembe, Timbales, WalkAbout, Gongs, Tahiko, and many others.

Discography   

His Book How To Play The WalkaBoutDrum is expected for 2021

Awards
 German Rock Pop Prize 2020 (best drummer). 
 German Rock Pop Prize 2018 (best cover band: Albert Böhne featuring Tony Liotta).
 The single "Funky Donkey" achieved gold status in Italy.
 Lifetime Achievement Award Eurocasting (2016 Italy)

References

Italian male musicians
1961 births
Musicians from Turin
German male musicians
Living people